Joseph Wearne (19 August 1832 – 8 June 1884) was an English-born Australian politician.

He was born at St Levan in Cornwall to miller Joseph Wearne and Susannah Rogers. He and his family migrated to Sydney in 1849, and after an attempt on the Victorian goldfields settled at Liverpool around 1853. Wearne became a flour miller. On 21 January 1857, he married Isabella Caldwell, with whom he had six children. He was elected to the New South Wales Legislative Assembly for West Sydney in 1869, transferring to Central Cumberland in 1875 but resigning later the same year due to bankruptcy. He was discharged in 1876. Wearne died at Liverpool in 1884. His nephew, Walter Wearne, also served in the Legislative Assembly.

References

 

1832 births
1884 deaths
Members of the New South Wales Legislative Assembly
People from Cornwall
Australian people of Cornish descent
British emigrants to Australia
19th-century Australian politicians